J. Adams may refer to:

People
 J. Allen Adams (1932–2017), American politician and lawyer
 J. B. Adams (born 1954), American character stage and film actor, director, and singer
 J. C. Adams (born 1970), American author, editor, reporter, and pornographic film director
 J. Christian Adams (born 1968), American attorney and conservative activist
 J. M. Adams (born 1834), American politician
 J. Stuart Adams, American politician
 J. T. Adams (1926–1993), American gospel singer, musician, and record label founder

Other uses
J. Adams (aircraft constructor); see List of aircraft

See also
John Adams (disambiguation)